The Anwar Cabinet was the fifth cabinet established by the State of Pasundan. It was composed of 11 ministers. Its term of office ran from 11 to 23 January 1950.

Background
After the recognition of Indonesia by the Dutch government on 27 December 1949, the previous prime minister Djumhana Wiriaatmadja resigned as the prime minister. Djumhana was replaced by Anwar Tjokroaminoto, the son of the national hero Oemar Said Tjokroaminoto. Sewaka accepted this offer, but he also insisted that the programs of the cabinet would carry out efforts towards the dissolution of the State of Pasundan. Sewaka's demands were firmly rejected by Wiranatakusumah. The task was therefore given to Anwar Tjokroaminoto. Anwar was given the mandate to form the cabinet by Wiranatakusumah on 7 January 1950. He finished forming his cabinet on 9 January 1950, and the cabinet was installed on 11 January 1950.

There were several changes regarding to the nomenclature of the ministries in the Anwar Cabinet. There were two new ministries, the Ministry of Religious Affairs and the Ministry of Enlightenment.

Composition

Ministers

The end of the cabinet

After the defeat of the APRA coup d'état on 23 January 1950, the government of the Republic of Indonesia accused the government of Pasundan for sponsoring the coup. Prime Minister Anwar Tjokroaminoto and Minister of Health Suria Kartalegawa was arrested, and the cabinet was dissolved. Seven days later, Wiranatakusumah, the head of state, stated that he would resign from his position.

After the resignation of Wiranatakusumah, the central government of the United States of Indonesia (RUSI) ordered Sewaka as the commissar of the RUSI for the State of Pasundan on 4 February 1950. The handover of the authority from Wiranatakusumah to Sewaka occurred on 10 February 1950. With the appointment of Sewaka, the State of Pasundan was under direct control of the United States of Indonesia.

Bibliography

References

Notes 

Cabinets of Pasundan
Cabinets established in 1950
Cabinets disestablished in 1950